Nanae may refer to:

Nanae (given name), a feminine Japanese given name
Nanae, Hokkaido, a town in Oshima Subprefecture, Hokkaido, Japan
Nanae Station, a railway station in the town of Nanae
news.admin.net-abuse.email, a Usenet newsgroup